Michel Magdinier is a former French slalom canoeist who competed from the late 1960s to the mid-1970s. He won a bronze medal in the K-1 team event at the 1973 ICF Canoe Slalom World Championships in Muotathal.

References

External links 
 Michel MAGDINIER at CanoeSlalom.net

French male canoeists
Living people
Year of birth missing (living people)
Medalists at the ICF Canoe Slalom World Championships